Thomas Michael Aldred (born 11 September 1990) is a professional footballer who plays as a central defender for Brisbane Roar. He began his career with Carlisle United in the Football League before joining Watford in 2010 and Colchester United in 2011. He failed to make a first-team appearance for either club, but made loan appearances for Stockport County, Inverness Caledonian Thistle and Barrow. Aldred joined Accrington Stanley in 2013 and then Blackpool two years later. He won promotion to League One with Blackpool in 2017 before joining Bury. In January 2018, he moved on loan to Motherwell, and then in August 2018, signed again on a season-long loan.

Club career

Carlisle United
Born in Bolton, Greater Manchester, Aldred began his senior career with Carlisle United. He was captain of the Carlisle youth team and signed his first professional contract with the club in December 2008.

Aldred won the 2008–09 season League One Apprentice of the Year Award, before winning Carlisle's youth team Player of the Year award.

In August 2009, Aldred joined Workington on an initial month-long loan and earned rave reviews from the Conference North side's manager, Darren Edmondson, during a stay that was extended to the maximum three months following some excellent displays in the Cumbrian side's defence. He went on to make his first team debut for Carlisle as a late substitute in a 1–0 home win over Wycombe Wanderers on 12 December 2009.

In May 2010, following a promising campaign, Aldred was offered a one-year contract extension with Carlisle. However, he rejected the offer and left the club, having made five first-team appearances for Carlisle.

Watford
Aldred joined Championship club Watford on a two-year deal on 1 July 2010, with a compensation offer made to Carlisle. He felt that the move south would benefit his career.

Still yet to make an appearance for Watford, Aldred joined Stockport County on loan in November 2010 until January 2011. He made seven appearances for County.

On 21 June 2011, Aldred joined Scottish Premier League club Inverness Caledonian Thistle on a six-month loan deal. He made his debut in a 3–0 away defeat to Motherwell on 23 July, and made four appearances in total, his last a 2–0 defeat to Rangers where he conceded a penalty as his loan was cut short only one month into the spell.

On his return to Watford, Aldred was released from the club having not made a first team appearance on 31 August 2011.

Colchester United

Colchester United manager John Ward signed Aldred on a two-year deal following his Watford release on 1 September 2011. Two months later, he was loaned to Torquay United from 24 November to 2 January as injury cover, although he failed to make an appearance for the Gulls.

Having failed to break into the Colchester first-team setup, Aldred joined Barrow on loan on 27 August 2012. He made his debut in a 2–0 defeat to Macclesfield Town. His loan was extended to the full 93 days allowed after he impressed during his initial month. Aldred completed his loan having made 13 appearances for Barrow.

After Colchester appointed Joe Dunne as manager, Aldred found himself further down the pecking order, and on 25 January 2013, the club announced that Aldred had been released from his contract.

Accrington Stanley
Following his release from Colchester, Aldred signed a contract until the end of the 2012–13 season with Accrington Stanley on 31 January 2013. He signed a new two-year contract with the club on 18 June having started the final 12 games of the 2012–13 season.

Blackpool
Aldred signed for Championship side Blackpool on a 28-day emergency loan on 31 January 2015, before signing permanently two days later on a one-and-a-half-year contract. Aldred helped Blackpool win promotion to League One in 2017.

Bury
Aldred signed for Bury in July 2017. He moved on loan to Scottish Premiership club Motherwell in January 2018. He made his debut for Motherwell on 20 January 2018, in a 2–0 win against Hamilton Academical in the Scottish Cup.

Aldred returned to Motherwell in August 2018, in a second loan deal with Bury. On 29 December 2018, he scored twice as Motherwell won 2–1 away to Hamilton Academical in the Lanarkshire derby.

Brisbane Roar
On 25 June 2019, Aldred signed for A-League club Brisbane Roar on a one-year deal. Ahead of the 2019–20 season, he was named club captain. Aldred's first goal for Brisbane Roar came against Adelaide United in February 2020. This goal came in the 74th minute and was the eventual winner in a 2–1 home victory.

International career
Aldred represented Scotland at under-19 level.

Career statistics

Honours
Blackpool
EFL League Two play-offs: 2017

References

External links

1990 births
Living people
Footballers from Bolton
English footballers
Scottish footballers
Scotland youth international footballers
English people of Scottish descent
Association football defenders
Carlisle United F.C. players
Workington A.F.C. players
Watford F.C. players
Stockport County F.C. players
Inverness Caledonian Thistle F.C. players
Colchester United F.C. players
Torquay United F.C. players
Barrow A.F.C. players
Accrington Stanley F.C. players
Blackpool F.C. players
Bury F.C. players
Motherwell F.C. players
Brisbane Roar FC players
National League (English football) players
English Football League players
Scottish Premier League players
Scottish Professional Football League players
A-League Men players